Robert Marshall Helm (July 18, 1914  – September 1, 2002) was a jazz clarinetist and saxophonist.

Helm was born in Fairmead, California and began playing brass instruments when he was young. He later turned to alto saxophone and by the age of 11 was a professional tenor saxophonist who also played several other instruments. He met Lu Watters and Turk Murphy in 1935 and began playing with them. Five years in the army were followed by returns to the same leaders.  He recorded an album as a leader in 1954. Helm continued to play into the 1990s and in 1994–95 recorded another album, Hotter than That, for Stomp Off. He died in San Rafael, California, on September 1, 2002.

References

Dixieland revivalist clarinetists
Dixieland clarinetists
Dixieland bandleaders
American jazz clarinetists
1914 births
2002 deaths
20th-century American musicians
People from Madera County, California
Jazz musicians from California
Yerba Buena Jazz Band members